Allan Gregorio (born 7 September 1992) is a Brazilian visual artist and portrait photographer. His work has been featured internationally in magazines such as Vogue, Attitude Magazine, The Face and Dazed.

Career
Allan Gregorio was born in São Paulo. He became interested in drawing and painting at a young age. At age seventeen, he started working as an assistant for a photographer of his hometown. Later, he studied photography and graphic design at Serviço Nacional de Aprendizagem Comercial (SENAC) in São Paulo. Alongside his work as a photographer, Gregorio has also worked as a graphic designer and visual artist in other countries.

Gregorio currently develops augmented reality filters for Instagram

Allan Gregorio is also an activist for LGBT+ rights.

Selected publications

2013-2015
2013: Índia Shaman – Zupi Magazine
2013: In Bloom – MMSCENE
2014: Casa de Criadores – Égalité Magazine 
2015: Made In – MMSCENE

2016 
2016: Mykki Blanco – VOGUE
2016: The hedonistic beauty of Glastonbury's Block9 – Mixmag
The world's wildest clubbing space – DJ Mag
NYC Downlow 10th birthday – London Evening Standard
People of Glastonbury's Outrageous LGBT Club NYC Downlow – Everfest
A moment with Lucy Fizz – NAKID Magazine
Taina Haines – NAKID Magazine
A Conversation with AWAYTOMARS – FuckingYoung

2018
Kyria Zoeter – MANUKA Magazine – Issue 5
Milkshake Festival Amsterdam – Gayletter

References

1992 births
People from São Paulo
Brazilian photographers
Living people
Brazilian designers